General elections were held in Luxembourg on 12 June 1994, alongside European Parliament elections. The Christian Social People's Party remained the largest party, winning 21 of the 60 seats in the Chamber of Deputies. It continued the coalition government with the Luxembourg Socialist Workers' Party.

Candidates

Results

By locality

The CSV won pluralities in three of the four circonscriptions, coming behind the LSAP in that party's Sud stronghold.  The CSV's vote was remarkably consistent across the whole of the country, whereas the other two main parties' votes varied wildly (particularly in Sud).  The Greens and ADR won disproportionate number of votes in the east-central region and north respectively.

The CSV won pluralities across most of the country, winning more votes than any other party in 86 of the country's (then) 118 communes.  The LSAP won pluralities in 21 communes, primarily in the Red Lands in the south.  The DP won 12 communes, particularly in its heartland of Luxembourg City and the surrounding communes.

References

Chamber of Deputies (Luxembourg) elections
Legislative election, 1994
Luxembourg
History of Luxembourg (1945–present)
June 1994 events in Europe